R. B. Lemberg (born Rose Lemberg; born 27 September 1976) is a queer, bigender, Ukrainian-American author, poet, and editor of speculative fiction.  Their work has appeared in publications such as Lightspeed, Strange Horizons, Beneath Ceaseless Skies, Sisters of the Revolution: A Feminist Speculative Fiction Anthology, Uncanny Magazine, and Transcendent 3: The Year's Best Transgender Speculative Fiction 2017.

Many of Lemberg's stories and poems are situated in Birdverse, an LGBTQIA+-focused secondary world. Their debut Birdverse novella The Four Profound Weaves was published by Tachyon in 2020 and was a finalist for the 2021 World Fantasy, Nebula, Locus, and Ignyte awards for Best Novella and was on the Honor List for the Otherwise Award. Their Birdverse novel, The Unbalancing was published by Tachyon in 2022. Lemberg's work has also been a finalist for the Nebula, Crawford, and other awards. Their Birdverse short fiction collection Geometries of Belonging: Stories & Poems From the Birdverse will be published by Fairwood Press in late 2022, and include a previously unpublished story, "Where Your Quince Trees Grow".

Biography 
Lemberg was born in L'viv, Ukraine on September 27, 1976. They are queer, bigender, and use singular they pronouns.  They lived in Russia and Israel before emigrating to the United States for graduate school at University of California, Berkeley.

In their academic life, Lemberg is a professor of sociolinguistics working on immigrant discourse, identity, and gender.

Lemberg lives in Lawrence, Kansas, with their spouse, Bogi Takács (who is also queer, trans, and an Eastern European Jewish person) and their child Mati.

Career 
Lemberg is the founding editor of Stone Telling, a magazine of speculative poetry that debuted in 2010 and was named for the main characters in Ursula K. Le Guin's novel Always Coming Home. In 2012, they collected and edited Here, We Cross (An Anthology of Queer and Genderfluid Poetry from Stone Telling 1–7) from the works published in the early issues of Stone Telling, and edited The Moment of Change: An Anthology of Feminist Speculative Poetry. In 2016, they edited the short fiction anthology An Alphabet of Embers: An Anthology of Unclassifiables, which focused on short fiction works that defied classification by genre. In 2021, as a tribute following the passing of Ursula K. Le Guin in 2018, Lemberg, and co-editor Lisa Bradley, edited Climbing Lightly Through Forests: A Poetry Anthology Honoring Ursula K. Le Guin.

Lemberg's poetry has been published in Strange Horizons, Goblin Fruit, Uncanny Magazine, Fireside Magazine, Apex Magazine and many others. Their poetry has won the Strange Horizons Readers' Poll multiple times: "In the Third Cycle" in 2011, "Between the Mountain and the Moon" in 2012, and "Ranra's Unbalancing" in 2015. Their poem, "I will show you a single treasure from the treasures of Shah Niya", came in third place for the 2014 Rhysling Award in the Long Poem category. Their debut poetry collection, Marginalia to Stone Bird was shortlisted for the 2017 Crawford Award and was a finalist for the 2017 and 2018 Elgin Awards. Their poetry memoir, Everything Thaws, which recalls Lemberg's early life in the Soviet Union and their migrations to Israel and the United States, is expected to be published in early 2023 by Ben Yehuda Press.

Lemberg was awarded the 2020 Le Guin Feminist Science Fiction Fellowship, sponsored by the University of Oregon Libraries Special Collections and University Archives, which gave them access to many of Le Guin's archives. On Lemberg's website, they revealed that their project for the Fellowship, for which the archival research was delayed by the COVID-19 pandemic, was primarily focused on Le Guin's poetry, which they previously discussed in their essay “The Poetry of Ursula K. Le Guin: A Retrospective” and appeared in Climbing Lightly Through Forests: A Poetry Anthology Honoring Ursula K. Le Guin.

During the 2022 Russian invasion of Ukraine, Lemberg translated works by Ukrainian poets for Chytomo, Springhouse Journal, and National Translation Month's Ukrainian Poetry in Translation Special Feature - Part II.

Lemberg's short fiction has been published in Lightspeed, Strange Horizons, Beneath Ceaseless Skies, Sisters of the Revolution: A Feminist Speculative Fiction Anthology, Uncanny Magazine, Daily Science Fiction, Transcendent 3: The Year's Best Transgender Speculative Fiction 2017, and others. Many of these stories are situated in their LGBTQIA+-focused secondary world, Birdverse. Their Birdverse novelette, "Grandmother-nai-Laylit's Cloth of Winds", was a finalist for the 2015 Nebula Award Finalist for Best Novelette and on the long list for the 2015 Tiptree Award. In 2020, their Birdverse novella, The Four Profound Weaves, was published by Tachyon to critical and reader acclaim, including a starred review and selection as a weekly pick by Publishers Weekly and a starred review from Library Journal. The Four Profound Weaves was a finalist for the 2021 World Fantasy Award, Nebula Award, Locus Award, and Ignyte Award for Best Novella, and was on the Honor List for the Otherwise Award.

Lemberg's debut Birdverse novel, The Unbalancing, an expansion of the story of their poem "Ranra's Unbalancing", was published by Tachyon in 2022 with positive reviews from Library Journal and Publishers Weekly. Their Birdverse collection, Geometries of Belonging: Stories & Poems from the Birdverse, received a starred review from Publishers Weekly ahead of its release from Fairwood Press in late 2022, and notes the inclusion of a new story in the collection, "Where Your Quince Trees Grow", which follows descendants of the main characters from The Unbalancing.

Awards and nominations 
 The Four Profound Weaves, Tachyon, 2020 – 2020 Nebula Award Finalist for Best Novella; 2021 Ignyte Award Finalist for Best Novella; 2021 Locus Award Finalist for Best Novella; 2021 World Fantasy Award Finalist for Best Novella, and was on the Honor List for the 2020 Otherwise Award.
 "Grandmother-nai-Laylit's Cloth of Winds", first published in Beneath Ceaseless Skies, issue #175 (June 2015) - 2015 Nebula Award Finalist for Best Novelette, and on the long list for the 2015 Tiptree Award.
Marginalia to Stone Bird, Aqueduct Press, 2016 - shortlisted for the Crawford Award, Finalist for the 2017 and 2018 Elgin Awards.
"Ranra's Unbalancing", Strange Horizons, 2015 - winner of the Strange Horizons Readers' Poll, 2015.
"I will show you a single treasure from the treasures of Shah Niya", Goblin Fruit, 2013 - came in third place for the 2014 Rhysling Award in the Long Poem category.
"Between the Mountain and the Moon", Strange Horizons, 2013 - winner of the Strange Horizons Readers' Poll, 2012.
"In the Third Cycle", Strange Horizons, 2011 - winner of the Strange Horizons Readers' Poll, 2011.

Selected bibliography

Novels

Birdverse 
 The Unbalancing, Tachyon, 2022

Short fiction

Collections 
 Geometries of Belonging: Stories & Poems from the Birdverse, Fairwood Press, 2022

Birdverse Stories

Other Short Fiction 
{|class='wikitable sortable' width='75%'
|-
!width=25%|Title
!|Year
!|Length
!|First published
|-
|"To Balance the Weight of Khalem"
|2020
|Novelette
|Beneath Ceaseless Skies, issue 300
|-
|"Luriberg-That-Was"
|2019
|Short story
|Nowhereville: Weird Is Other People, ed. C. Dombrowski and Scott Gable, Broken Eye Books
|-
|"These Are the Attributes by Which You Shall Know God"
|2018
|Short story
|GlitterShip, summer 2018
|-
|"Retrying"
|2017
|Short Story
|Daily Science Fiction
|-
|"The Shapes of Us, Translucent to Your Eye"
|2015
|Short Story
|The Journal of Unlikely Academia
|-
|"How to Remember to Forget to Remember the Old War"
|2015
|Short story
|Lightspeed, issue 61
|-
|"Stalemate"
|2014
|Short story
|Lackington's, issue 4
|-
|"No Longer Lacking an Onion"
|2014
|Short story
|Goldfish Grimm's Spicy Fiction Sushi, #19
|-
|"A City on Its Tentacles"
|2014
|Short story
|Lackington's, issue 1
|-
|"Theories of Pain"
|2013
|Short story
|Daily Science Fiction
|-
|"Teffeu: A Book From the Library at Taarona"
|2013
|Short story
|Strange Horizons
|-
|"Seven Losses of Na Re"
|2012
|Short story
|Daily Science Fiction
|-
|"Giant"
|2011
|unknown
|Not One of Us
|-
|"Kifli"
|2010
|Short story
|Strange Horizons
|-
|"Geddarien"
|2008
|Short story
|Fantasy Magazine, December 2008
|-
|"To Find Home Again"
|2008
|unknown  
|Warrior Wisewoman, ed. Roby James, Norilana Books
|}

 Poetry 

 Collections 
  Everything Thaws - Ben Yehuda Press, 2023
  Marginalia to Stone Bird – Aqueduct Press, 2016

 Birdverse Poems 

 Editor 
 Climbing Lightly Through Forests: A Poetry Anthology Honoring Ursula K. Le Guin (with Lisa Bradley) - Aqueduct Press, 2021.
 An Alphabet of Embers: An Anthology of Unclassifiables – Stone Bird Press, 2016
 Here, We Cross (An Anthology of Queer and Genderfluid Poetry from Stone Telling 1–7) – Stone Bird Press, 2012.
 The Moment of Change: An Anthology of Feminist Speculative Poetry - Aqueduct Press, 2012.
 Stone Telling magazine, 2010-2016

 Non-fiction 
 "Sergeant Bothari and Disability Representation in the Early Vorkosiverse", Strange Horizons, 2018
 "The Uses and Limitations of the Folklorist's Toolkit for Fiction", Strange Horizons, 2015
 "Encouraging Diversity: An Editor's Perspective", Strange Horizons, 2015
 "Not Only a Hero's Journey", with Shweta Narayan, Stone Telling, 2011
 "Silence to Speech", Stone Telling, 2010

 Notes 

 See also 
 List of fantasy authors
 List of LGBT writers

 References 

 External links 
 
 
 R. B. Lemberg's Patreon

 Interviews 
 My Favorite Bit: R. B. Lemberg Talks About The Four Profound Weaves, Alyshondra Meacham, MaryRobinetteKowal.com
 Noticing Language: An Interview with Rose Lemberg, Julia Rios, Strange Horizons, 2013
 R. B. Lemberg talks The Birdverse, Identity and Government, Dominic Walsh, SciFiPulse, 2021
 R. B. Lemberg: A Different Adventure, Locus, 2021
 Interview with R. B. Lemberg (The Unbalancing), The Fantasy Hive, 2022
 Author Interview: Queer Norms and Sexualities in R. B. Lemberg's Birdverse, Jaymee Goh, Beneath Ceaseless Skies'', 8 September 2022

1976 births
Living people
21st-century American writers
Jewish American writers
American science fiction writers
Transgender Jews
University of California, Berkeley alumni
Israeli emigrants to the United States
American people of Ukrainian-Jewish descent
American people of Russian-Jewish descent
American LGBT poets
21st-century American Jews
Ukrainian emigrants to the United States
Ukrainian science fiction writers
21st-century LGBT people
Queer writers
Transgender non-binary people
People on the autism spectrum
American transgender writers
American non-binary writers